The Bay of Death is a 1926 Soviet silent drama film directed by Abram Room.

Synopsis
One of the southern ports are taken over by the whites. After a failed attempt to steal ammunition from the barracks for the partisans, Nikolai Razdolny (A. Matsevich) runs to a lighthouse where the guerrillas have strengthened their positions. White Guards establish surveillance of Nicholas' father, Ivan (V. Yaroslavtsev), who previously did not share the views of his son. When they arrest the revolutionary command of the "Swan" ship together with older Razdolny, the mechanic, they order him to assume his former responsibilities. When the "Swan" is approaching the lighthouse, the mechanic opens the Kingston, and the ship begins to sink.

Cast
 V. Yaroslavtsev as Ivan Razdolny (mechanic)
 A. Matsevich as Nikolai Razdolny (eldest son of Ivan)
 Vasili Lyudvinsky as Pavlik Razdolny (youngest son of Ivan)
 A. Ravich Elisaveta Razdolny (wife of Ivan)
 Nikolai Saltykov as Surkov
 Leonid Yurenev as Masloboev
 Elizaveta Kartasheva as Anna Kuznetsova
 Aleksei Kharlamov as captain of the ship
 Artashes Ai-Artyan as Saim
 Boris Zagorsky as spy
 Andrey Fayt as Alibekov

References

Bibliography 
 Christie, Ian & Taylor, Richard. The Film Factory: Russian and Soviet Cinema in Documents 1896-1939. Routledge, 2012.

External links 
 

1926 films
1926 drama films
Soviet drama films
Russian drama films
Soviet silent feature films
1920s Russian-language films
Soviet black-and-white films
Russian black-and-white films
Russian silent feature films
Silent drama films